Riga Technical University (RTU) is the oldest technical university in the Baltic countries established on October 14, 1862. It is located in Riga, Latvia and was previously known as 'Riga Polytechnical Institute' and 'Riga Polytechnicum'.

History

Riga Polytechnical Institute (1862–1918)
Riga Polytechnicum was first established in 1862 and was the first poly technical institute in Imperial Russia. It offered degrees in agriculture, chemistry, engineering, mechanics, trade and architecture, with education in German.

In addition to four technical faculties (architecture, engineering, mechanical engineering, chemistry), the polytechnic also included an agricultural and a commercial faculty. The first lecturers came from Germany, Switzerland and Austria-Hungary. The language of instruction was German.

Between 1863 and 1869, the number of students grew from sixteen to ninety. In 1869 the polytechnic moved into a new building. Since there was a lack of technical universities in Russia, many students - especially from the Baltic Sea governments - had gone to study at ETH Zurich, Karlsruhe Institute of Technology, TU Dresden and Leibniz University Hannover. That should be changed. On January 1, 1874, Alexander II of Russia introduced general conscription. Now all men from the age of 21 had to serve fifteen years, six in Imperial Russian Army and nine in the reserve. For graduates of the Russian university who wanted to study, the period of service was only six months. This difference led to a significant increase in student numbers. At the beginning of the academic year 1874/75, 59 students enrolled, the total student body comprised 201 members. In the course of Russification, Nicholas II of Russia nationalized the university by decree of May 6, 1896. From 1896 to 1918 it was called the Riga Polytechnic Institute (Rīgas Politehniskais institūts - RPI). The number of students continued to increase, reaching 2088 students in 1913/14. In 1918/19 the Polytechnic was called the Baltic Technical University (Baltijas Tehniskā augstskola).

In 1896, it was renamed Riga Polytechnical Institute and the language of instruction was changed to Russian. The establishment of a faculty of architecture at the Polytechnicum in 1869 was instrumental in providing Riga with a group of locally trained architects, with consequences for the development of the characteristic Art Nouveau architecture in Riga.

When World War I started in 1914, the Riga Polytechnical Institute was evacuated to Moscow and worked there until 1918. After that, part of the faculty returned to Latvia and joined the newly established University of Latvia.

In 1919, the university was incorporated as a technical faculty of the Latvian University of Applied Sciences (Latvijas Augstskola, since 1923: University of Latvia), which was founded after independence. On September 1, 1958, their technical faculties were spun off again and raised to an independent university. From 1958 to 1983 it was called the Riga Polytechnic Institute, and then renamed the Arvīds Pelše Institute of Technology in Riga (Arvīda Pelšes vārdā nosauktais Rīgas politehniskais institūts). In the mid-1970s, the university became the largest university in the Latvian Soviet Socialist Republic. It has been called the Riga Technical University since March 1990. On April 23, 1992, a student parliament was founded. It is the oldest student self-government in Latvia.

Riga Technical University, 1958–present 
Riga Polytechnical Institute was re-established in 1958 by splitting off the engineering departments from the State University of Latvia. In 1990, it was renamed to Riga Technical University. The university currently consists of 9 faculties:
 Faculty of Architecture and Urban planning
 Department of Architectural Design
 Department of History and Theory of Architecture 
 Department of Fine Arts
 Faculty of Electronics and Telecommunications
 Department of Telecommunications Networks
 Department of Transmission Systems 
 Department of Transport Electronics and Telematics 
 Department of Radiosystems
 Department of Electronics Equipment
 Department of Fundamentals of Electronics
 Faculty of E-Learning Technologies and Humanities 
 Department of Sport
 Department of Social Sciences
 Department of Engineering pedagogy and Psychology
 Department of Languages for Special Purposes 
 Department of Technical Translation
 Faculty of Electrical and Environmental Engineering
 Department of Electrical Engineering and Electronics
 Department of Industrial Electronics and Electrical Technologies
 Department of Power System Control and Automation
 Department of Electrical Machines and Apparatus
 Department of Electric Power Supply
 Department of Environment and Energy Systems 
 Faculty of Computer Science and Information Technology
 Department of Modelling and Simulation
 Department of Management Information Technology
 Department of Image Processing and Computer Graphics 
 Department of Computer Networks and Systems Technology
 Department of Computer Control Systems
 Department of Applied Computer Science
 Department of Software Engineering
 Department of Artificial Intelligence and Systems Engineering
 Department of Engineering Mathematics 
 Department of Probability Theory and Mathematical Statistics
 Faculty of Building and Civil engineering
 Department of Roads and Bridges
 Department of Geomatics
 Department of Structural Analysis
 Department of Structural Engineering
 Department of Computer Aided Engineering Graphics 
 Department of Heat and Gas Technology
 Department of Water Engineering and Technology
 Department of Civil Building Construction
 Department of Construction Technology
 Department of Composite Materials and Structure
 Department of Building Materials and Products
 Faculty of Engineering economics
 Department of Occupational Safety and Civil Defence 
 Department of International Business, Transport Economics and Logistics
 Department of Customs and Taxes
 Department of Civil Engineering and Real Estate Economics and Management 
 Department of the Territorial Development Management and Urban Economics
 Department of Quality Technology
 Department of Innovation and Business Management
 Department of Corporate Finance and Economics
 Faculty of Materials Science and Applied Chemistry
 Department of Silicate, High Temperature and Inorganic Nanomaterials Technology
 Department of Polymer Materials Technology
 Department of General Chemical Engineering
 Department of Materials Physics 
 Department of Semiconductor Physics
 Department of Optics
 Department of Chemistry
 Department of Chemical Technology of Biologically Active Compounds
 Department of Design and Materials Technologies
 Department of Clothing and Textile Technologies
 Faculty of Transport and Mechanical engineering
 Department of Aeronautical Technologies
 Department of Avionics
 Department of Aircraft Theory and Design
 Department of Transport Systems and Logistics
 Department of Medical Physics and Engineering
 Department of Nanoengineering
 Department of Instrument Engineering
 Department of Material Processing Technology
 Department of Theoretical Mechanics and Strength of Materials
 Department of Mechanical Engineering and Industrial Design 
 Department of Heat and Power Engineering Systems
 Department of Railway Transport 
 Department of Automotive Engineering
 Department of Railway Automatics and Telematics
, it had 14,006 students. 3,525 out of these students were foreign students and 514 doctoral students.

Riga Business School 

The Riga Business School is a management–education institution within Riga Technical University. It was founded in 1991, in close cooperation with the State University of New York at Buffalo (USA) and the University of Ottawa (Canada), and it was the first higher education institution in the Baltic states that offered Master of Business Administration (MBA) programs in English.

The school currently has more than 800 MBA graduates, mostly middle- and upper-level managers both in Latvia and abroad. The education standards and structure are adopted from the North-American style MBA, which contains case studies, working in groups, and active participation in classrooms.

Rankings 

In March 2017, RTU announced that it had won the first place among universities in Latvia in the international U-Multirank rating. The employment of RTU graduates is rated the highest (at the A level). The same evaluation was given to the university for bachelor's programs in English, for self-created or spin-off companies, for the post-doctoral study process and creativity in science.

RTU is also the highest rated Latvian higher education institution «Times Higher Education Rating» in the 2020 Sustainability Assessment, which evaluates the performance of universities in sustainable development. place in the group of the highest rated universities. RTU was rated the highest in the category "Planet protection" - in 2020 RTU was recognized as the 14th best in the world in this field

RTU is also included in other European and world-class university rankings such as "QS World University Rating", "Eduniversal" and "GreenMetric".

Notable faculty and alumni 
Some of its most notable graduates are the Latvian-born Nobel Prize laureate Wilhelm Ostwald, the legendary Mayor of Riga George Armitstead, the former President of Latvia Andris Bērziņš, Prime Minister Valdis Dombrovskis and many others who have earned distinction in science and society.

Wilhelm Ostwald – Nobel Prize in Chemistry, faculty 1881–1887 
Alfred Rosenberg – German politician, Nazi Minister of Occupied Eastern Territories, executed for war crimes, alumnus
Paul Walden – chemist, invented ethylammonium nitrate as the first example of an ionic liquid, alumnus
Friedrich Zander – rocketry and spaceflight pioneer, alumnus
Ignacy Mościcki – president of Poland (1922–1939), alumnus
Bruno Abakanowicz – Polish mathematical and electrical engineer, alumnus
Władysław Anders – a general in the Polish army and a politician with the Polish government-in-exile
Zbigņevs Stankevičs – Roman Catholic metropolitan archbishop of Riga (2010–), alumnus
Moisei Ginzburg – Constructivist architect (1892–1946), alumnus
George Armitstead (Latvian: Georgs Armitsteds, 1847 – 1912) was an engineer, entrepreneur and the fourth Mayor of Riga. One of the most influential Rigans of his time, Mayor of Riga (1901–1912), graduate of Riga Polytechnicum (1869, with distinction).
Mikhail Dolivo-Dobrovolsky (-1919) Engineer and inventor, creator of the three-phase alternating current power transmission system, RPI student (1878-1881).
Ernst Enno – Estonian poet and writer, RPI student (1896-1904).
Juhan Kukk – State Elder (head of government) of Estonia (1922–1923), RPI graduate 1904–1910.
Zigfrīds Anna Meierovics – the first Minister of Foreign Affairs and the second Prime Minister of the Republic of Latvia, RPI graduate (1911)
Hugo Celmiņš – Politician, social activist, agriculturist, twice held the office of Prime Minister of Latvia. RPI graduate (1903
Andris Bērziņš – President of the Republic of Latvia,  who won the presidential election held on 2 June 2011,RPI graduate (1971)
Valdis Dombrovskis – Latvian politician who was Prime Minister of Latvia 2009 - 2014, RTU graduate (1995)

Affiliations and alliances 
The Riga Technical University is one of the eight holders of the European University of Technology, EUt+, with the Technical University of Sofia, Bulgaria, the Cyprus University of Technology, Cyprus, the Hochschule Darmstadt, University of Applied Sciences, Germany, the Technological University Dublin, Ireland, Polytechnic University of Cartagena, Spain, the University of Technology of Troyes, France, the Technological University Dublin, Ireland and the Technical University of Cluj-Napoca, Romania.

The European University of Technology, EUt+ is the result of the alliance of eight European partners who share in common :

the "Think Human First" vision towards a human-centred approach to technology
the ambition to establish a new type of institution on a confederal basis

Through EUt+, the partners are committed to creating a sustainable future for students and learners in European countries, for the staff of each of the institutions and for the territories and regions where each campus is anchored.

Gallery

References

External links 

The English version of the web site of the RTU

 
Educational institutions established in 1862
Universities in Latvia
1862 establishments in the Russian Empire